Aleksander Konstantin von der Bellen (5 July 1859 – 11 February 1924), later known as Alexander van der Bellen, and called Sascha by family and friends, was a Russian liberal politician and nobleman.

Background

Bellen belonged to the von der Bellen family, a Russian noble family of Dutch origin, which had been recognised as noble in Russia in the early 19th century and which belonged to the affluent gentry of Pskov. He spoke Russian as his first language.

Alexander Konstantin von der Bellen was the grandfather of the current Austrian President and former Austrian Green Party leader, Alexander Van der Bellen.

Civil service and political career
He held various administrative posts in Pskov and in the wider province of the Russian Empire, serving as provincial commissar (head of the provincial government) of Pskov. He was also a member of the Russian Provisional Government in March and July 1917, before the Imperial German Army invaded the Pskov area during World War I.

Escape to Estonia
In the summer of 1919, when Pskov was briefly occupied by the Estonian Army, Bellen fled from the advancing Bolshevik Red Army with his wife and sons and settled in the newly independent Estonia. In Estonia, the family changed the nobiliary particle in its name from the German von to the Dutch van, because the German noble particle, used by many of the Russian nobility, was specifically banned by law in Estonia as an indication of Russian nobility.

References

Politicians of the Russian Empire
People from Pskov
Russian people of Dutch descent
Russian people of German descent
White Russian emigrants to Estonia
1859 births
1924 deaths
Van der Bellen family